

Ælfwold (or Ælfweald or Aelfwold) was a medieval Bishop of Crediton.

Ælfwold was elected to Crediton in 1008. He died between 1011 and 1015.

Citations

References

External links
 

Bishops of Crediton (ancient)
10th-century English bishops
11th-century English Roman Catholic bishops
1010s deaths
Year of birth unknown